Micropterix trifasciella is a species of moth belonging to the family Micropterigidae and was described by John Heath in 1965.

References

Micropterigidae
Moths described in 1965
Moths of Europe
Taxa named by John Heath